Secher is a surname. Notable people with the surname include:

David Secher, British businessman, specializing in research commercialization
Niels Henry Secher (born 1946), Danish rower and medical researcher 
Steen Secher (born 1959), Danish Olympic sailor